Richard Byrd may refer to:

Richard C. Byrd (1805–1854), American politician
Richard E. Byrd (1888–1957), admiral, polar explorer, aviator
Richard Byrd (athlete) (1892–1958), American Olympic athlete
Rick Byrd (born 1953), American basketball player and coach
Ricky Byrd, musician with Joan Jett and the Blackhearts
Richard Byrd (American football) (born 1962), American football player
Richard Evelyn Byrd Sr. (1860–1925), Virginia politician
Richard Evelyn Byrd III (1920–1988), United States naval officer and Antarctic explorer

See also
Richard Bird (disambiguation)
Richard Birde (disambiguation)